was a Japanese manga artist. He graduated from the Department of Visual Communication Design at Musashino Art University. He made his professional debut in 2003 with the one-shot "", winning Monthly Ikki magazine's Ikiman award for rookie artists. On October 9, 2011, an employee of Aoyama's publisher Kodansha called the police because they had not been able to contact him for several days. The police broke into Aoyama's Tokyo apartment and found him dead in a suicide by hanging. Two days later on October 11, 2011, Kodansha published the last completed chapter of his manga series  in Evening magazine. On February 23, 2012, Shogakukan released a collection of Aoyama's early works titled The Dog Race:  (THE DOG RACE ). The volume contains eight one-shots, including Aoyama's university graduation project and several previously unreleased manga.

Works

One-shots
 "" (Monthly Ikki May 2003, Shogakukan)
 "Drip" (Monthly Ikki October 2003, Shogakukan)
 "" (Monthly Ikki August 2004, Shogakukan)

Serializations
 Swweeet (Monthly Ikki April 2005 – June 2006, Shogakukan)
  (Continue  33–43, 45–46, Ohta Publishing)
  (script by Rei Hanagata, Big Comic 2009  3–11, Shogakukan)
  (Evening 2010 No. 18  – 2011 No. 21, Kodansha)

Anthologies
  (February 27, 2007, Shogakukan)
 collects "" and "School Attack Syndrome", both adapted from works of the same name by Ōtarō Maijō
 The Dog Race:  (February 23, 2012, Shogakukan)
 collects "Fake Fur", "Untitled", " UFO", " UFO '05", "", "The Dog Race", "Drip", and ""

References

External links

 

1979 births
2011 suicides
Japanese cartoonists
Manga artists
Suicides by hanging in Japan
2011 deaths